Mail-in-a-Box is free, Open Source software for mail server hosting developed by Joshua Tauberer. The software's goal is to enable any user to turn a cloud system into a mail server in few hours. The tool enables developers to host mail for multiple users and multiple domain names.

The default configuration provides a spam detection system, monitoring, reporting and backup mechanisms. It can also set up and automatically renew a Let's Encrypt certificate, as well as configuring the detailed DNS configurations needed to ensure that a mail server's IP address is trusted by other servers, and less likely to be blacklisted.

First developed in 2013 by Tauberer, the tool is written in Python. The project supports Ubuntu LTS.

References

External links 
 Official website
 
 Latest Release 60.1

Free software programmed in Python
2013 software
Free software culture and documents
Ubuntu